The 2016 Guangzhou Evergrande Taobao season was the 63rd year in Guangzhou Evergrande's existence and was its 49th season in the Chinese football league, also its 27th season in the top flight.

Guangzhou was knocked out in the group stage of 2016 AFC Champions League for the first time but won all three domestic titles for the second time in club's history. Brazilian attacking midfielder Ricardo Goulart won Chinese Football Association Footballer of the Year as well as the golden boot of the league by scoring 19 goals. Luiz Felipe Scolari won Manager of the Year title. Seven players including Feng Xiaoting, Gao Lin, Ricardo Goulart, Kim Young-Gwon, Paulinho, Zhang Linpeng and Zeng Cheng was elected in the eleven-man squad of 2016 Chinese Super League Team of the Year.

Transfers

In

Winter

Summer

Out

Winter

Summer

Coaching staff

Pre-season and friendlies

Training matches

FC Schalke 04 China Tour

Competitions

Chinese Super League

Table

Results summary

Results by round

Matches

Chinese FA Cup

Chinese FA Super Cup

AFC Champions League

Group stage

Statistics

Appearances and goals

Goalscorers

Assists

Disciplinary record

Notes

References

Guangzhou F.C.
Guangzhou F.C. seasons